Michel Gravel (1936 – 13 January 2021) was a Canadian photographer. He was one of the leading photojournalists in Quebec.

Biography
After he finished his studies in photography in 1954, Gravel worked for the Studio David Bier from 1956 to 1957. After that, he worked for newspapers such as Le Devoir, the Montreal Gazette, and La Presse. During his tenure, he covered major events such as the Vietnam War and the 1976 Summer Olympics. He officially retired in 2005.

Michel Gravel died on 13 January 2021 at the age of 84.

References

1936 births
2021 deaths
Canadian photojournalists
Le Devoir people
Montreal Gazette people